Drupadia cinesia is a butterfly in the family Lycaenidae. It was described by William Chapman Hewitson in 1863. It is found on Borneo.

References

Butterflies described in 1863
cinesia
Butterflies of Borneo
Taxa named by William Chapman Hewitson